Poongudi is a village in the Annavasalrevenue block of Pudukkottai district, Tamil Nadu, India.

Demographics 

As per the 2001 census, Pungudi had a total population of 1432 with 726 males and 706 females. Out of the total population 908    people were literate.

References

Villages in Pudukkottai district